High Havoc is the second LP by Corduroy, released by Acid Jazz Records in 1993. Billed as a concept album, it includes several top ten singles on the UK Indie Chart and many favourite Corduroy tunes. The album was reissued on vinyl by Acid Jazz Records in 2018.

Reception
In his review for Louder Than War, Matt Mead states: "The single "London England" became a dancefloor classic in the 1990s, which I’m sure would have influenced Albarn, Coxon, Rowntree and James to ask the fabric four to support Blur at their ground breaking Alexandra Palace concert in 1994". Select rated the album 1/5, saying "Even the most cursory encounter with this rambling muzak would be enough to proclaim Corduroy the most pedestrian dullards on the block. Incidental music for incidental lives."

Track listing
All tracks by Ben Addison, Scott Addison, Richard Searle and Simon Nelson-Smith, except where noted.

 "High Havoc" – 4:10
 "London England" – 3:22
 "The Corduroy Orgasm Club" – 1:46
 "The Frighteners" – 5:09
 "You're A Great Way To Fly" – 2:37
 "Something In My Eye" (Ben Addison, Scott Addison) – 3:23
 "Lovely, Lonely And Loaded" – 4:05
 "Breakfast In Love" – 2:48
 "One Born Every Minute" – 4:50
 "Follow That Arab" – 4:52
 "Nobody Move" – 2:28
 "Very Yeah" – 5:08
 "Clearing Up Music" – 2:20
 "10. 28 from Shibuya" - 3:05

Personnel
Ben Addison - vocals, drums
Scott Addison - vocals, keyboards, guitar
Simon Nelson-Smith - guitars
Richard Searle - bass guitar
Roger Beaujolais - vibraphone on "Something In My Eye"
Sherine Abeyratne - vocals on "Something In My Eye"
Michael Smith - saxophone, flute
Sid Gould - trumpet
Dennis Rollins - trombone

Charts

References

External links
Corduroy - www.acidjazz.co.uk

1993 albums
Corduroy (band) albums
Acid Jazz Records albums